The Aarberg District was an administrative district of the canton of Bern, Switzerland. Its capital was the town of Aarberg. The district contained 12 municipalities covering an area of :
CH-3270 Aarberg
CH-3282 Bargen 
CH-3257 Grossaffoltern
CH-3283 Kallnach
CH-3273 Kappelen
CH-3250 Lyss
CH-3045 Meikirch
CH-3283 Niederried bei Kallnach
CH-3271 Radelfingen
CH-3255 Rapperswil
CH-3054 Schüpfen
CH-3267 Seedorf

From 1 January 2010, the district has been replaced by the Seeland (administrative district), whose administrative centre is Aarberg.

Former districts of the canton of Bern